Georgi Markov may also refer to:
 Georgi Markov (1929–1978) was a Bulgarian dissident
 Georgi Markov (historian), (born 1946), Bulgarian historian
 Georgi Markov (politician), (born 1950), Bulgarian politician and lawyer
 Georgi Markov (footballer) (1972–2018), Bulgarian football player
 Georgi Markov (weightlifter) (born 1978), Bulgarian weightlifter
 Georgi Markov (wrestler), (born 1946), Bulgarian wrestler